Ebonstar is a computer game developed by MicroIllusions in 1988 for the Amiga. The player character commands a fleet of spacecraft around an ever-moving, extremely dangerous black hole in this space-based competition set in the 31st century. The player fires the fleet's weaponry at opponents' spacecraft to knock them into the black hole and destroy them. However, the black hole also spits out more opponents as well. As many as four players can compete simultaneously.

In 1988, Dragon gave the game 5 out of 5 stars.

References

External links
Review in Info

1988 video games
Amiga games
Amiga-only games
MicroIllusions games
Multiplayer and single-player video games
Science fiction video games
Scrolling shooters
The Dreamers Guild games
Video games developed in the United States